This is a list of former high school athletic conferences in the Central Region of Ohio, as designated by the OHSAA. If a conference had members that span multiple regions, the conference is placed in the article of the region most of its former members hail from. Because the names of localities and their corresponding high schools do not always match and because there is often a possibility of ambiguity with respect to either the name of a locality or the name of a high school, the following table gives both in every case, with the locality name first, in plain type, and the high school name second in boldface type. The school's team nickname is given last.

Buckeye Athletic Conference
 Bexley Lions (1991-2003, to Mid-State)
 Sunbury Big Walnut Golden Eagles (1991–97, to Ohio Capital)
 Grandview Heights Bobcats (1991-2003, to Mid-State)
 Plain City Jonathan Alder Pioneers (1991-2003, to Mid-Ohio in 2013)
 Johnstown-Monroe Johnnies (1991–94, to Mid-Buckeye)
 Hebron Lakewood Lancers (1991-2003, to Mid-State)
 Newark Licking Valley Panthers (1991-2003, to Mid-State)
 London Red Raiders (1991-2003, to South Central Ohio)
 London Madison-Plains Golden Eagles (1991–93, 1997-2003, to South Central Ohio)
 Lewis Center Olentangy Braves (1991–97, to Ohio Capital)
 Utica Redskins (1991–99, to Mid-Buckeye)
 West Jefferson Roughriders (1991-2003 to Mid-State in 2006)
 Washington Court House Washington Blue Lions (1993-2003, to South Central Ohio)
 Greenfield McClain Tigers (1999-2001, to Southern Buckeye)
 Gahanna Columbus Academy Vikings (2001–03, to Mid-State)
 Milford Center Fairbanks Panthers (2001–03, to Northwest Central)
 Washington Court House Miami Trace Panthers (2001–03, to South Central Ohio)
 Whitehall-Yearling Rams (2001–03, to Mid-State)

Buckeye Central Conference
 Findlay Trojans (1987–1995, to Great Lakes League)
 Fremont Ross Little Giants (1987–1991, to Great Lakes League)
 Lancaster Golden Gales (1987–1995, to Ohio Capital Conference 1997)
 Newark Wildcats (1987–1995, to Ohio Capital Conference)
 Zanesville Blue Devils (1987–1995, to Ohio Valley Athletic Conference)

The league was created after the Buckeye Conference folded.  The league was an unideal resort for member schools that had to bear extensive travel. Fremont Ross was able to gain membership in the now-defunct Great Lakes League in 1991, leaving the four schools to struggle on. Findlay eventually gained membership in the GLL as Zanesville left for the closer OVAC confederation, effectively ending competition. Lancaster and Newark would end up going from leagues struggling to retain members to joining the Ohio Capital Conference, which is the largest proper conference in the state.

Central Buckeye League
There were two versions of the CBL. The first ran from 1929 to 1966. The second version ran from 1976 to 1991, where after joining with schools from the Licking County League, it was rebranded as the Buckeye Athletic Conference (BAC).

First Version (1929-1966)
 Bexley Lions (1929–66, to Franklin County League)
 Grandview Heights Bobcats (1929–66, to Franklin County League)
 Granville Blue Aces (1929–30)
 Westerville Wildcats (1929–50, to Mid-6 League)
 Marysville Monarchs (1930–45, to Mid-State League (1945–50))
 Circleville Tigers (1931–39, to South Central Ohio League)
 Delaware Hayes Pacers (1932–66, Delaware Willis Bobcats before 1963)
 Upper Arlington Golden Bears (1939–66, to Franklin County League)
 Worthington Cardinals (1939–45, to Franklin County League, 1958–66, to Franklin County League)
 Mount Vernon Yellow Jackets (1947–66)
 Urbana Hillclimbers (1950–66)
 Whitehall-Yearling Rams (1958–66, to Metropolitan League)

Second Version (1976-1991)

During this period, the league would play as one division from 1977 through 1980.  The league would split its teams beginning in 1981.  The two 6 team divisions were roughly divided by enrollment with the larger schools making up the Buckeye Division and the smaller schools forming the Central Division.
After New Albany leaves the league in 1984, Olentangy will move to the Central Division with new member, London, replacing Olentangy in the Buckeye.  The divisions would drop to 5 members each for the 1990-91 school year as Buckeye Valley & North Union leave.
 Plain City Jonathan Alder Pioneers1 (1976–91, to BAC)
 Bexley Lions (1976–91, to BAC)
 Sunbury Big Walnut Eagles2 (1976–91, to BAC)
 Gahanna Columbus Academy Vikings3 (Boys only, 1976–91)
 Columbus School for Girls Unicorns (Girls only, 1976–91)
 Marysville Monarchs4 (1976–91, to Ohio Capital Conference)
 New Albany Golden Eagles (1976–84, to Mid-Buckeye League)
 Lewis Center Olentangy Braves4 (1976–91, to BAC)
 Radnor Buckeye Valley Barons5 (1977–90, to Mid-Ohio Athletic Conference)
 Dublin Shamrocks (1977–91, to Ohio Capital Conference)
 Grandview Heights Bobcats (1977–91, to BAC)
 Richwood North Union Wildcats (1977–90, to Mid-Ohio Athletic Conference)
 West Jefferson Roughriders (1977–91, to BAC)
 London Red Raiders (1984–91, to BAC)

 Concurrent with CBL and Darby Valley League 1976-77.
 Concurrent with CBL and Mid-Ohio League 1976-77.
 Concurrent with CBL and Mid-Buckeye League 1976-77.
 Concurrent with CBL and Metropolitan League 1976-77.
 Concurrent with CBL and Mid-Ohio League 1977-78.

Central Ohio League
One of the first large-school conferences in Central and East Ohio, its widespread geography led to membership instability through its lifespan.

 Cambridge Bobcats (1926–58, to Ohio Valley Athletic Conference 1960)
 Coshocton Redskins (1926–61, to Cardinal Conference)
 Lancaster Golden Gales (1926–85, to Buckeye Central Conference 1987)
 Mount Vernon Yellow Jackets (1926–35, 1945–47, to Central Buckeye League)
 Newark Wildcats (1926–85, to Buckeye Central Conference 1987)
 Westerville Wildcats (1926–29, to Central Buckeye League)
 Zanesville Blue Devils (1926–29, 1931–85, Lash until 1954, to Buckeye Central Conference 1987)
 Marietta Tigers (1936–85, to Southeast Ohio Athletic League)
 Chillicothe Cavaliers (1941–44, to South Central Ohio League, 1948–76, to Ohio Capital Conference)
 Dover Tornadoes (1941–57, to Cardinal Conference 1960)
 Ironton Tigers (1963–68, to Southeast Ohio Athletic League)
 Upper Arlington Golden Bears (1968–81, to Ohio Capital Conference)
 Grove City Greyhounds (1976–81, to Ohio Capital Conference)

Delaware County League
 Ashley Elm Valley Aces2,5 (Ashley before 1952, 192?-63, consolidated into Buckeye Valley)
 Bellepoint Bears (192?-52, consolidated into Scioto Valley)
 Galena Golden Eagles (192?-50, consolidated into Big Walnut)
 Harlem Hawks (192?-50, consolidated into Big Walnut)
 Hyatts Hornets (192?-53, consolidated into Olentangy)
 Kilbourne Brown Bears(192?-52, consolidated into Elm Valley)
 Lewis Center Olentangy Braves6 (Lewis Center before 1953, 192?-63, to Mid-Ohio)
 Ostrander Scioto Valley Rockets7 (Ostrander before 1953, 192?-63, consolidated into Buckeye Valley)
 Powell Pirates (192?-53, consolidated into Olentangy)
 Radnor Trojans (192?-63, consolidated into Buckeye Valley)
 Sunbury Wildcats1,3 (192?-50, consolidated into Big Walnut)
 West Berlin Warriors (192?-53, consolidated into Olentangy)
 Sunbury Big Walnut Golden Eagles4,6 (1950-63, to Mid-Ohio)

 Concurrent with Mid-State League 1946-49.
 Concurrent with Mid-Buckeye League 1948-53.
 Concurrent with Mid-Buckeye League 1948-50.
 Concurrent with Mid-Buckeye League 1950-54
 Concurrent with Mid-Ohio Conference 1953-63.
 Concurrent with Mid-Ohio Conference 1954-63.
 Concurrent with Mid-Ohio Conference 1956-63.

Franklin County League
Organized with the beginning of the state basketball tournament in 1922, the league membership was fairly fluid, as schools left for other regional and power leagues, and often returned again. The league was one that was directly hindered by the creation of the Ohio Capital Conference, as two of its five remaining members left for the league in 1968, and the other schools left to fill in spots in other conferences.

 Bexley Lions (1922-29, to Central Buckeye League, 1966–68, to Mid-8 League)
 Gahanna Columbus Academy Vikings (1922-49, to Mid-State, 1957-66, to Mid-Buckeye)
 Canal Winchester Indians (1922-57, to Mid-State League, 1964–66, to Mid-State League)
 Dublin Shamrocks (1922-68, to Metropolitan League)
 Columbus Franklin Heights Falcons (1922-58, to South Central Ohio League)
 Grandview Heights Bobcats (1922-29, to Central Buckeye League, 1966–68, to Mid-8 League)
 Grove City Greyhounds (1922-50, to Mid-6 League)
 Groveport-Madison Cruisers (1922-58, to Mid-8 League)
 Columbus Hamilton Township Rangers (1922-64, to South Suburban League)
 Hilliards Wildcats (1922-50, to Mid-6 League)
 Gahanna Lincoln Golden Lions (1922-58, to Mid-8 League)
 Columbus Mifflin Cowpunchers (1922-58, to Mid-8 League)
 New Albany Eagles (1922-65, to Mid-Buckeye League)
 Reynoldsburg Raiders (1922-66, to Metropolitan League)
 Upper Arlington Golden Bears (1922-39, to Central Buckeye League, 1966–68, to Central Ohio League)
 Westerville Wildcats (1922-26, to Central Ohio League)
 Whitehall-Yearling Rams (1922-58, to Central Buckeye League)
 Worthington Cardinals (1922-39, to Central Buckeye League, 1945–50, to Mid-6 League, 1966-68, to Ohio Capital Conference)
 West Jefferson Roughriders (1963–68, to Metropolitan League)

Knox County League
 Amity Aces2 (192?-58, consolidated into Mount Vernon)
 Bladensburg Blades3 (192?-61, to Knox-Morrow)
 Centerburg Trojans (192?-48, to Mid-Buckeye League)
 Danville1 Blue Devils (192?-55, to Mid-Buckeye League)
 Fredericktown Freddies (192?-61, to Johnny Appleseed)
 Gambier Pirates2 (192?-58, consolidated into Mount Vernon)
 Howard Bulldogs3 (192?-61, to Knox-Morrow)

 Concurrent with Mid-Buckeye League 1954-55.
 Concurrent with Knox-Morrow League 1955-58.
 Concurrent with Knox-Morrow League 1955-61.

Knox-Morrow League
Formed in 1955, this league was formed by smaller schools in the two counties to solve scheduling issues with their dwindling county leagues (which all remained in). The league folded after the 1961-62 school year, as consolidation left only two schools.

 Amity Aces1 (1955-58, consolidated into Mount Vernon)
 Bladensburg Blades2 (1955-62, consolidated into Howard)
 Chesterville Eagles3 (1955-62, consolidated into Highland)
 Gambier Pioneers1 (1955-58, consolidated into Mount Vernon)
 Howard Bulldogs2 (1955-62, became East Knox and joined Mid-Buckeye in 1963)
 Johnsville Johnnies3 (1955-62, rejoined Morrow County League)
 Marengo Wildcats3 (1955-62, consolidated into Highland)
 Sparta Spartans3 (1955-60, consolidated into Marengo)

 Concurrent with KCL throughout membership.
 Concurrent with KCL until 1961.
 Concurrent with MCL throughout membership.

Marion County League
 Caledonia Scots (pre-1931-62, consolidated into River Valley)
 Claridon Hornets (pre-1931-62, consolidated into River Valley)
 Green Camp Panthers (pre-1931-62, consolidated into Elgin)
 Kirkpatrick Cougars (pre-1931-48, consolidated into Morral)
 Larue Indians (pre-1931-62, consolidated into Elgin)
 Martel Eagles (pre-1931-62, consolidated into River Valley)
 Meeker Trojans (pre-1931-57, consolidated into Ridgedale)
 Morral Wildcats (pre-1931-57, consolidated into Ridgedale)
 New Bloomington Rams (pre-1931-62, consolidated into Elgin)
 Marion Pleasant Pandas (before 1958)/Spartans (pre-1931-69, to North Central)1
 Prospect Bulldogs (pre-1931-62, consolidated into Elgin)
 Waldo Cardinals (pre-1931-62, consolidated into River Valley)
 Morral Ridgedale Rockets (1957–69, to North Central)1
 Green Camp Elgin Comets (1962–69, to North Central)1
 Caledonia River Valley Vikings (1962–69, to North Central)1
 Teams played concurrently in the MCL and NCC from 1962 to 1969.

Metropolitan League (Columbus Area)
This conference started as the South Suburban League in 1964, then changed names as it expanded two years later. Weakened by the beginning of the Ohio Capital Conference in 1968, the conference finally folded in 1977, with the beginning of the second Central Buckeye League.

 Columbus Franklin Heights Falcons (1964–77)
 Columbus Hamilton Township Rangers (1964–77)
 Grove City Pleasant View Panthers (1964–68, to Ohio Capital Conference)
 Ashville Teays Valley Vikings (1964–77, to South Central Ohio League)
 Reynoldsburg Raiders (1966–68, to Ohio Capital Conference)
 Whitehall-Yearling Rams (1966–68, to Ohio Capital Conference)
 Dublin Shamrocks (1968–77, to Central Buckeye League)
 West Jefferson Roughriders (1968–77, to Central Buckeye League)
 Lewis Center Olentangy Braves1 (1970–77, to Central Buckeye League)
 Grandview Heights Bobcats (1972–77, to Central Buckeye League)
 Marysville Monarchs1 (1972–77, to Central Buckeye League)

 Concurrent with both ML and CBL during 1976-77.

Mid-8 League
Was the Mid-6 League 1950-58. This was another league that was weakened by the Ohio Capital Conference's creation (along with the Franklin County League and Metropolitan League), it finally folded six years later.

 Grove City Greyhounds (1950–74, to Central Ohio League 1976)
 Hilliard Wildcats (1950–74, to Ohio Capital Conference)
 London Red Raiders (1950–74, to Central Buckeye Conference)
 Marysville Monarchs (1950–72, to Metropolitan League)
 Westerville Wildcats (1950–68, to Ohio Capital Conference)
 Worthington Cardinals (1950–58, to Franklin County League)
 Groveport-Madison Cruisers (1958–74, to Ohio Capital Conference)
 Gahanna Lincoln Golden Lions (1958–68, to Ohio Capital Conference)
 Columbus Mifflin Cowpunchers (1958–73, to Columbus City League)
 Bexley Lions (1968–74, to Central Buckeye League 1976)
 Grandview Heights Bobcats (1968–72, to Metropolitan League)

Mid-Ohio Conference
The Mid-Ohio Conference was founded in 1953 and remained a fairly stable league until 1977, when three teams left to join the Central Buckeye League. The league lasted as an eight-team league for much of the rest of their existence until 1990, when the four Morrow County schools left to join the newly formed Mid-Ohio Athletic Conference. Three other teams joined the North Central Conference, while the one other, Marion Catholic, remained independent for a number of years.

 Cardington-Lincoln Pirates2 (1953–1990, to Mid-Ohio Athletic Conference)
 Ashley Elm Valley Aces3 (1953–1963, consolidated into Buckeye Valley)
 Marion Catholic Fighting Irish (1953–1990, St. Mary until 1957, to Northwest Central Conference 2001)
 Mount Gilead Indians1 (1953–1990, to Mid-Ohio Athletic Conference)
 Richwood Tigers1,4 (1953–1965, consolidated into North Union)
 Delaware Olentangy Braves3 (1954–1970, to Metropolitan League)
 Sunbury Big Walnut Golden Eagles3,6 (1954–1977, to Central Buckeye League)
 Ostrander Scioto Valley Rockets3 (1956–1963, consolidated into Buckeye Valley)
 Delaware Buckeye Valley Barons (1963–1977, to Central Buckeye League)
 Sparta Highland Scots (1963–1990, to Mid-Ohio Athletic Conference)
 Richwood North Union Wildcats (1965–1977, to Central Buckeye League)
 Galion Northmor Golden Knights (1970–1990, to Mid-Ohio Athletic Conference)
 Centerburg Trojans (1977–1981, to Mid-Buckeye Conference)
 Crestline Bulldogs (1977–1990, to North Central Conference)
 Fredericktown Freddies (1977–1990, to North Central Conference)
 Loudonville Redbirds (1981–1984, to Mohican Area 1989)
 Ontario Warriors (1983–1990, to North Central Conference)

 Concurrent with Mid-Buckeye League 1953-54.
 Concurrent with Morrow County League until 1963.
 Concurrent with Delaware County League until 1963.
 Concurrent with Union County League until 1965.
 Concurrent with Central Buckeye League 1976-77.

Morrow County League
Another of the county-wide small school conferences, the MCL ended in 1963 as two of the three remaining schools went to the Mid-Ohio Conference, where the third would land a few years later.

 Cardington-Lincoln Pirates1,2 (192?-63, to Mid-Ohio Conference
 Chesterville Eagles (192?-62, consolidated into Highland)
 Edison Tigers(192?-60, consolidated into Mount Gilead)
 Iberia Presidents (192?-63, consolidated into Northmor)
 Johnsville Johnnies (192?-63, consolidated into Northmor)
 Marengo Wildcats (192?-62, consolidated into Highland)
 Mount Gilead Indians (192?-45, to Mid-State League (1945-50))
 Sparta Spartans (192?-60, consolidated into Marengo)
 Sparta Highland Scots (1962-63, to Mid-Ohio Conference)

 Concurrent with MCL and Mid-Buckeye League 1948-54.
 Concurrent with MCL and Mid-Ohio Conference 1953-63.

Union County League
 Broadway Bears (192?-50, consolidated into Northwestern)
 Byhalia-York Falcons (192?-65, Byhalia before 1950, consolidated into North Union)
 Unionville Center Darby Tigers (192?-61, consolidated into Fairbanks)
 New California Jerome Township Knights (192?-50, consolidated into Dublin)
 Magnetic Springs Resorters (192?-63, consolidated into Richwood)
 Raymond Rangers (192?-50, consolidated into Northwestern)
 Richwood Tigers1,2,3 (192?-65, consolidated into North Union)
 Milford Center Union Wolves (192?-61, consolidated into Fairbanks)
 Watkins Warriors (192?-50, consolidated into Marysville)
 Somersville York Blue Bombers (192?-50, consolidated into Byhalia-York)
 Raymond Northwestern Bears (1950-63, consolidated into Marysville)
 Milford Center Fairbanks Panthers4 (1961-65, to Logan County League)

 Concurrent with Mid-State League (1945-50) for duration of that league's existence
 Concurrent with Mid-Buckeye League 1950-54.
 Concurrent with Mid-Ohio Conference 1953-65.
 Concurrent with Logan County League 1961-65.

See also
Ohio High School Athletic Association
Ohio High School Athletic Conferences
OHSAA Central Region athletic conferences

Notes and references